Cicindela altaica is a species of tiger beetle in the genus Cicindela. It was described by Eschscholtz in 1829 and is endemic to Altai Mountains in Russia.

References

altaica
Endemic fauna of Russia
Insects of Russia
Beetles described in 1829
Taxa named by Johann Friedrich von Eschscholtz